Ujjain Cricket Stadium is a proposed international stadium at Nanakheda, Ujjain. Ujjain Development Authority gave land to build a sport venue which includes cricket stadium, indoor stadium, tennis court, aquatic centre as well as stadia for other outdoor sports like athletics, football and hockey.

The proposed stadium will be built on a 30-acre site, which has been taken over by Ujjain Divisional Cricket Association.  It will also be equipped with flood lights for night matches, a swimming pool, sauna bath, modern gym, dressing room, and 30 corporate boxes. This will be the fourth international stadium in Madhya Pradesh after the recent completion of  Barkatullah University Stadium, Indore Sports Complex and Gwalior International Cricket Stadium.

References

External links 

 Ujjain Development Authority
 wikimapia

Sports venues in Ujjain
Buildings and structures in Ujjain
Cricket grounds in Madhya Pradesh
Proposed sports venues in India
Proposed stadiums